Óscar Valero Navarro (born 28 August 1985) is a Spanish footballer who plays for SD Ejea as a right defender.

Club career
Born in Zaragoza, Aragon, Valero started playing senior football with local UD Casetas in the 2002–03 season, in Tercera División. In 2004, he joined CD Mirandés, in Segunda División B.

In 2005 summer Valero signed with Real Zaragoza, being initially assigned to the reserves also in the third level. On 25 November 2007 he made his first-team – and La Liga debut, starting in a 1–1 home draw against Getafe CF; he finished the season with just four appearances, totalling 185 minutes of action, and the main squad also suffered relegation.

Valero was released by Zaragoza in 2009, and went on to resume his career in the third level, representing CF Atlético Ciudad, Benidorm CF and CD Guijuelo.

References

External links

Óscar Valero at Soccerway

1985 births
Living people
Footballers from Zaragoza
Spanish footballers
Association football defenders
La Liga players
Segunda División B players
Tercera División players
CD Mirandés footballers
Real Zaragoza B players
Real Zaragoza players
Benidorm CF footballers
CD Guijuelo footballers
CD Tudelano footballers
CD Ebro players
SD Ejea players